Rameswaram Taluk is a taluk of Ramanathapuram district of the Indian state of Tamil Nadu. The headquarters of the taluk is the town of Rameswaram. The taluk comprises the whole area of Pamban Island.

Demographics
According to the 2011 census, the taluk of Rameswaram had a population of 82,682 with 41,995  males and 40,687 females. There were 969 women for every 1000 men. The taluk had a literacy rate of 75.51. Child population in the age group below 6 was 4,561 Males and 4,406 Females.

References 

Taluks of Ramanathapuram district